There are 114,000 mosques in Egypt as of 2016, of which 83,000 are affiliated with the Ministry of Endowments. This list includes notable mosques within Egypt.

See also

 Islam in Egypt
 Lists of mosques
 List of mosques in Cairo

References 

Egypt
 
Mosques